The Battle of Tucapel (also known as the Disaster of Tucapel) is the name given to a battle fought between Spanish conquistador forces led by Pedro de Valdivia and Mapuche (Araucanian) Indians under Lautaro that took place at Tucapel, Chile on December 25, 1553. This battle happened in the context of the first stage of the Arauco War, named the "offensive war" within a larger uprising by Araucanians against the Spanish conquest of Chile. It was a defeat for the Spaniards, resulting in the capture and eventual death of Valdivia.

Background

The Arauco War was a large scale war that took place in what is now Chilean territory between Spanish conquerors and Mapuches. Pedro de Valdivia was the Spanish conqueror, who founded the first cities in Chilean territory. Around 1550, he took a Mapuche man who had offered his services as his servant. The conqueror baptized him as Felipe Lautaro. Under Pedro de Valdivia's wing, Lautaro quickly learned horse-riding and Spanish military techniques that he would use later in the war that was taking place at the moment. Once he had learned this knowledge, he eventually went back to his village and decided to use these techniques to his advantage. At the same time, Pedro de Valdivia was using a policy of quickly founding cities, and dispersing his forces in the conquered territory. His forces also built numerous forts, like Tucapel and Purén.

Valdivia went on an inspection tour of a group of forts constructed to secure the Chilean interior for the Spanish.  He left Concepción in December 1553 and worked his way south to Quilacoya, where he gathered troops for the march into the restive territory of Arauco.  Mapuche spies observed his column from the hills, but merely followed and did not present themselves for battle. Meanwhile, the Mapuche leader Lautaro kept the forces of Gómez de Almagro bottled up in the nearby fort of Purén through various trickery.  He learned through his spies of the southwards movements of Valdivia, and realized that they would probably pass through the fort of Tucapel.

Valdivia became perturbed by the lack of news from Tucapel and by the lack of hostility on the road.  On December 24, he decided that he would make for the fort, hoping to find Almagro and his troops there.  The tranquility and the occasional sightings of Indians in the distance continued to raise his suspicion, and he sent an advance scouting team of five men under the command of Luis de Bobadilla to explore the road ahead and return information about the location of the enemy.

Battle

Tucapel fort was located on a hill in the coastal mountain range. In December 1553, Mapuche forces, under the command of the vice toqui Lautaro attacked and destroyed the fort using the battle tactics learned from the Spanish. Pedro de Valdivia had left Concepción with only 50 soldiers and sent a message to Purén fort to send reinforcements. The message, however, was intercepted by Lautaro's men.

Valdivia received no reports from his leading element, and spent the night a half day's journey from Tucapel.  On Christmas Day, December 25, 1553, he left early in the morning for the fort, arriving in its vicinity with silence reigning.  He found it completely destroyed.  Neither Gómez de Almagro nor Bobadilla was anywhere to be found.  He decided to make camp amidst the damp ruins of the fort, but the contingent had hardly begun to make preparations when there were shouts from the surrounding forest.  Without advance warning, a mass of Mapuche warriors charged out towards the Spanish enclave.

A veteran soldier, Valdivia had time to form and arm his defensive line and repulsed the first attack.  The cavalry charged upon the rearguard of the retreating Mapuche force, but the Indians were prepared for this action and reversed the charge with lances.  However, with much valor and resolution the Spaniards managed to drive back the resulting Mapuche surge into the forest.  The Spaniards savored their temporary victory.

There was still more to come, however.  A second squadron of Mapuches attacked, this time armed with maces and ropes as well as lances, with which they succeeded in dismounting the unfortunate Spanish caballeros, whom they quickly dragged out of the battlefield once they were on the ground.  The Spanish managed to drive them back, but not without leaving many fallen.  Then a third group of Mapuches appeared, this time with Lautaro behind it.

Valdivia, aware of the desperate situation due to the Spanish losses and fatigue, gathered together his available men and threw himself into the bitter fight.  Already half of the Spanish forces were casualties and the Indian auxiliaries were steadily being reduced.  Valdivia, seeing that the fight was lost, ordered the retreat, but Lautaro himself came around the flank and sealed the Spanish fate.  The Indians felled every one of the Spaniards, and only Valdivia and the cleric Pozo, who rode the best horses, were able to escape.  However, when crossing the swamps the men became bogged down and the Mapuches eventually captured them.

Valdivia's death
According to Jerónimo de Vivar, the toqui Caupolicán personally ordered the execution of Valdivia, who was killed with a lance and his head, along with those of the two other bravest Spaniards, were put on display.  Alonso de Góngora Marmolejo writes Valdivia offered as a ransom for his life that he would evacuate the Spanish settlements in their lands and give them large herds of animals, but this was rejected and the Mapuche cut off his forearms, roasted and ate them in front of him before killing him and the priest.  Pedro Mariño de Lobera wrote that Valdivia offered to evacuate the lands of the Mapuche but says he was shortly after killed by a vengeful warrior named Pilmaiquen with a large club, saying Valdivia could not be trusted to keep his word once freed. Lobera also mention that a common story in Chile at the time was that Valdivia was killed by giving him the gold that the Spaniards so desired; however, the gold was molten and was poured down Valdivia's throat.  According to a later legend, Lautaro took Valdivia to the Mapuche camp and put him to death after three days of torture, extracting his beating heart and eating it with the Mapuche leaders.

Following the battle Caupolicán went on to blockade the city of Valdivia and the few remaining Spanish settlements in the south of Chile. Lautaro watched the Spanish forces in Concepción, the center of the Spanish power in southern Chile.  The Spanish turned into disarray as the succession of the governorship was for a while in dispute between three men.

See also
 List of battles won by Indigenous peoples of the Americas
History of Chile
Arauco War
Pedro de Valdivia
Lautaro

Notes

References
Jerónimo de Vivar, Pedro Mariño de Lobera and Alonso de Góngora Marmolejo all were in Chile at the time of this battle and wrote about it from other participants accounts.
 Jerónimo de Vivar,  Crónica y relación copiosa y verdadera de los reinos de Chile (Chronicle and abundant and true relation of the kingdoms of Chile) ARTEHISTORIA REVISTA DIGITAL; Crónicas de América (on line in Spanish)
  Capítulo CXV Que trata de la salida del gobernador don Pedro de Valdivia de la ciudad de la Concepción y de la desgracia que hubo
 Alonso de Góngora Marmolejo, Historia de Todas las Cosas que han Acaecido en el Reino de Chile y de los que lo han gobernado (1536–1575) (History of All the Things that Have happened in the Kingdom of Chile and of those that have governed it (1536–1575)), University of Chile: Document Collections in complete texts: Chronicles (on line in Spanish)
  Capítulo XIV. De cómo se le alzó la tierra a Valdivia y la causa que para ello hubo; y de cómo saliendo a la pacificació le dieron una gran batalla en que lo mataron a él y cuantos con él iban
 Mariño de Lobera, Pedro, Crónica del Reino de Chile , escrita por el capitán Pedro Mariño de Lobera....reducido a nuevo método y estilo por el Padre Bartolomé de Escobar.  Edición digital a partir de Crónicas del Reino de Chile Madrid, Atlas, 1960, pp. 227–562, (Biblioteca de Autores Españoles ; 569–575).  Biblioteca Virtual Miguel de Cervantes (on line in Spanish)
 Capítulo XLIII De la memorable batalla de Tucapel entre Caupolicán y valdivia, donde murieron él con todo su ejército, haciéndole traición el famosísimo indio Lautaro
 Diego de Rosales, Historia General del Reino de Chile, Flandes Indiano, 3 vols. Valparaíso 1877 – 1878.
  Historia general de el Reyno de Chile: Flandes Indiano Vol. 1, Libro III Cap. XXXV Cuéntasse el famoso hecho de Lautaro y la muerte del Gobernador Pedro de Valdivia con los suyos.

Conflicts in 1553
Cañete, Chile
1553 in the Captaincy General of Chile
Battles involving Spain
Battles of the Arauco War
December events